Manuel Stiefler (born 25 July 1988) is a German professional footballer who plays as a midfielder for Regionalliga Bayern club SpVgg Unterhaching.

Career
After Stiefler's contract with Karlsruher SC expired in summer 2020, the club was still considering an extension in August.

Having spent six months as a free agent, Stiefler joined Super League Greece club AEL in January 2021, on a six-month deal. 

On 21 July 2021, Stiefler returned to Germany and signed with SpVgg Unterhaching on a three-year contract.

References

External links
 
 

Living people
1988 births
Association football midfielders
German footballers
German expatriate footballers
1. FC Nürnberg II players
1. FC Saarbrücken players
SV Sandhausen players
Karlsruher SC players
Athlitiki Enosi Larissa F.C. players
SpVgg Unterhaching players
2. Bundesliga players
3. Liga players
Super League Greece players
Regionalliga players
Sportspeople from Bayreuth
Footballers from Bavaria
Expatriate footballers in Greece
German expatriate sportspeople in Greece